Frank Dueckerhoff (born February 3, 1962) is a German retired professional ice hockey defenceman. He played four seasons with Düsseldorfer EG in the Deutsche Eishockey Liga, from 1980-1985.

References

1962 births
Living people
Düsseldorfer EG players
German ice hockey defencemen